Alexandra Chaves (born 2001) is a Canadian dancer and actress, known for her role as Piper on the Family and CBBC series The Next Step.

Career 
In 2011, Chaves won the title of Mini Miss Dance Canada. She was also a member of the Toronto Raptors Junior Hip Hop Crew and was part of the National Ballet School of Canada's professional program. In 2016, Chaves joined the Family series The Next Step in its fourth season as Piper. She is still a cast member of the show. As part of her work with The Next Step, Chaves has participated in Family Channel's Stand Up! anti-bullying campaign. In 2017, Chaves toured the UK with co-stars of The Next Step as part of the Disney Channel Big Ticket Concert. In 2019 she toured Australia, New Zealand and the UK again with The Next Step.

Chaves is a Plan Canada Youth Advocate.

Personal life 
Chaves went to St. Benedict Catholic Secondary School before attending Virtual High School to accommodate her television career. At age 12, she was diagnosed with heart arrhythmia that meant she would need to take a nine-month break from dancing.

Filmography

References

External links 
 

2001 births
21st-century Canadian actresses
Actresses from Ontario
Canadian female dancers
Canadian child actresses
Canadian television actresses
Living people
People from Cambridge, Ontario